Matei Zaharia is a Romanian-Canadian computer scientist, educator and the creator of Apache Spark.

As of April 2022, Forbes ranked him and Ion Stoica as the 3rd-richest people in Romania with a net worth of $1.6 billion.

Biography
Zaharia graduated from secondary school at Jarvis Collegiate Institute before moving to become an undergraduate at the University of Waterloo. 
Zaharia was a gold medalist at the International Collegiate Programming Contest, where his team University of Waterloo placed fourth in the world and first in North America in 2005. During his undergraduate degree at the University of Waterloo, he also greatly contributed to water rendering physics in the now open-source game called 0 A.D.
While at University of California, Berkeley's AMPLab in 2009, he created Apache Spark as a faster alternative to MapReduce. He received the 2014 ACM Doctoral Dissertation Award for his PhD research on large-scale computing.

In 2013 Zaharia was one of the co-founders of Databricks where he serves as chief technology officer.

He joined the faculty of MIT in 2015, and then became an assistant professor of computer science at Stanford University in 2016.

In 2019, Zaharia received the Presidential Early Career Award for Scientists and Engineers.

In 2019 he was spearheading MLflow at Databricks, while still teaching.

See also
 List of University of Waterloo people

References

External links
Website at Stanford
Chinese translation of his PhD Dissertation by CSDN community, January 2015

Canadian computer scientists
Romanian computer scientists
Living people
Romanian emigrants to Canada
Canadian people of Romanian descent
Stanford University faculty
UC Berkeley College of Engineering alumni
University of Waterloo alumni
Chief technology officers
Open source advocates
Year of birth missing (living people)